George Hague (June 30, 1915 – May 28, 1989) was an American rower. He competed in the men's coxless four at the 1936 Summer Olympics.

References

External links
 

1915 births
1989 deaths
American male rowers
Olympic rowers of the United States
Rowers at the 1936 Summer Olympics
Rowers from Buffalo, New York